Thunder Hill is a mountain in Sullivan County, New York. It is located west-southwest of Grahamsville. Denman Mountain is located north-northeast and South Hill is located east-southeast of Thunder Hill.

References

Mountains of Sullivan County, New York
Mountains of New York (state)